The Chief Technologist is the most senior technology position at the National Aeronautics and Space Administration (NASA). The Chief Technologist serves as the principal advisor to the NASA Administrator in technology policy and programs, and as interface to the national and international engineering community. The position helps "communicate how NASA technologies benefit space missions and the day-to-day lives of Americans."

History
The Chief Technologist position was created to advise the NASA Administrator on budget, strategic objectives, and current content of NASA's technology programs. The Chief Technologist works closely with appropriate representatives of the NASA Strategic Enterprises and the Field Centers, as well as advisory committees and the external community. The Chief Technologist represents the Agency's technology objectives and accomplishments to other federal agencies, industry, academia, other government organizations, the international community, and the general public. "The Chief Technologist leads NASA technology transfer and technology commercialization efforts, facilitating internal creativity and innovation." He also "coordinates, tracks and integrates technology investments across the agency and works to infuse innovative discoveries into future missions."-

The position was created in 2010 by NASA Administrator Charlie Bolden. The first three Chief Technologists were aerospace engineering professors whose universities (specified below) entered into an intergovernmental personnel agreement with NASA. Douglas Terrier, was the NASA Johnson Space Center Chief Technologist before becoming the Agency Chief Technologist.

On November 1, 2021 the Office of the Chief Technologist and the Office of Strategic Engagements and Assessments were merged into the new Office of Technology, Policy, and Strategy (OTPS). Dr. Bhavya Lal was appointed to serve as OTPS’s new Associate Administrator. The role of the NASA Chief Technologist was changed to one of a staff position in the newly created OTPS. Douglas Terrier was reassigned to NASA’s Johnson Space Center (JSC) in Houston to serve in a newly created position as the associate director for vision and strategy. In the interim, Dr. Lal will serve as acting chief technologist.

List of Chief Technologists
 Dr. Bobby Braun of Georgia Tech, February 3, 2010 to September 30, 2011
 (Acting) Joseph Parrish, October 1, 2011 to December 31, 2011 
 Dr. Mason Peck of Cornell, January 1, 2012 to 2013
 Dr. Dave Miller of MIT, March 2014 to 2016
 (Acting) Dennis J. Andrucyk, 2016 to January 17, 2017
 Dr. Douglas Terrier, 2017 to October 31, 2021
Dr. Terrier served as Acting Chief Technologist from 2017 to 2018
(Acting) Dr. Bhavya Lal, November 1, 2021 to present

References